"This Old Heart" is a song written by James Brown and recorded by Brown and The Famous Flames. Although they performed it in a rhythm and blues style, it originated as a country song. Released as a single in 1960, it charted #20 R&B and #79 Pop. It was the group's last release on Federal Records before they switched to its parent label, King. It was also one of their first songs to be released in the United Kingdom (by Fontana).

References

James Brown songs
The Famous Flames songs
Songs written by James Brown
1960 singles
1960 songs
Federal Records singles